Flying Over Sunset is a musical with music by Tom Kitt, lyrics by Michael Korie, and book by James Lapine. The musical is a fictional account of a meeting between Aldous Huxley, Clare Boothe Luce and Cary Grant, who all used the drug LSD.

Productions

Readings (2015 and 2016) 
The musical had a reading in August 2015 at the Vineyard Arts Project (Martha's Vineyard) with Christine Ebersole playing Luce, and a cast featuring Boyd Gaines, Julia Murney, Tam Mutu and David Turner.

A second reading was held on July 29, 2016 in Edgartown, Massachusetts. Performers who took part in the reading included the late Marin Mazzie, Boyd Gaines, Betsy Wolfe, Tam Mutu and Jennifer Simard.

Broadway (2021) 
The production was originally scheduled to open on April 16, 2020, but was postponed due to the COVID-19 pandemic.

The musical premiered on Broadway at the Vivian Beaumont Theater on November 11, 2021 in previews with the official opening on December 13, 2021.

The cast included Carmen Cusack as Clare Boothe Luce, Harry Hadden-Paton as Aldous Huxley, and Tony Yazbeck as Cary Grant. The musical was directed by Lapine with choreography by Michelle Dorrance, sets by Beowulf Boritt, costumes by Toni-Leslie James, lighting by Bradley King, and sound by Dan Moses Schreier.

The production closed on January 16, 2022 after 63 performances (28 previews and 35 performances).

Plot

Act l 
Huxley, Grant, and Luce separately obtain LSD. Each is dealing with a problem: Huxley is grieving his wife's death, Grant his ineptitude with women, and Luce her guilt over the deaths of her mother and daughter. Huxley takes LSD at the drugstore where he obtained it, and imagines the figures from the painting “Judith With the Head of Holofernes” coming to life around him ("Bella Donna Di Agonia"). Grant's first trip sees him meeting his younger self and his violent father ("I Have It All"/"Funny Money").

The three ultimately meet at the Brown Derby restaurant in Hollywood.

Act ll 
Huxley, Grant, and Luce gather at Luce's estate in Malibu, where they proceed on LSD trips with Gerald Heard as their guide.

Cast

Musical numbers
Source: Playbill

Act I
"The Music Plays On" - Company
"Bella Donna Di Agonia" - Judith, Handmaiden, Aldous
"Wondrous" - Aldous
"Bella Donna Di Agonia" (Reprise) - Aldous
"I Have It All" - Cary
"Funny Money" - Archie, Cary, Father
"A Sapphire Dragonfly" - Clare, Ann, Austin
"Someone" - Clare
"Flying Over Sunset" - Clare, Gerald, Ann, Austin
"Flying Over Sunset" (Reprise) - Clare, Aldous, Gerald, Cary, Company

Act II
"Om" - Gerald, Clare, Aldous, Cary
"Huxley Knows" - Clare, Cary, Aldous
"My Mother and I" - Clare, Cary, Gerald, Archie, Father, Ann, Austin
"The Music Plays On" (Reprise) - Aldous, Maria
"I Like to Lead" - Sophia, Cary
"Rocket Ship" - Cary
"An Interesting Place" - Austin, Ann, Clare
"If Only I'd Known" - Clare, Austin, Ann
"How?" - Clare
"Three Englishmen" - Cary, Gerald, Aldous
"The Melancholy Hour" - Maria, Ann, Austin, Archie, Father, Rosalia
"The 23rd Ingredient" - Clare, Cary, Aldous, Gerald
"Bella Donna Di Agonia" (2nd Reprise) - Judith, Handmaiden

Reception 
The show received mixed to negative reviews from critics, including AmNY, The New York Times, Theatrely, and Timeout. Generally, critics tended to dislike the book and music, while praising the show's cast, technical effects, set, sound design, and choreography.

Awards and nominations

Original Broadway production

Flying Over Sunset tied with MJ the Musical for the Drama Desk Award for Outstanding Lighting Design for a Musical.

References

External links
Flying Over Sunset Internet Broadway Database
 Flying Over Sunset Lincoln Center

Broadway musicals
2021 musicals
Musicals by James Lapine
Musicals by Tom Kitt (musician)
Drugs in popular culture